Gura Jub may refer to:
Gura Jub-e Baba Karam
Gura Jub-e Morad Beyg
Gura Jub-e Qeshlaq
Gura Jub-e Zeyyed Ali